Ricardo Renato de Conceição (born July 16, 1984), known as Ricardo Conceição, is a Brazilian footballer who plays for Atlético Tubarão as midfielder.

Career statistics

References

External links

1984 births
Living people
Brazilian footballers
Association football midfielders
Campeonato Brasileiro Série A players
Campeonato Brasileiro Série B players
Associação Atlética Ponte Preta players
Esporte Clube Santo André players
Esporte Clube Vitória players
Associação Desportiva São Caetano players
Comercial Futebol Clube (Ribeirão Preto) players
Paraná Clube players
Associação Chapecoense de Futebol players
Ceará Sporting Club players
Clube Atlético Tubarão players
Sportspeople from Campinas